This article lists every club's goalscorers in the Intercontinental Cup.

Overall top goalscorers

List of hat-tricks

Goalscorers by club

Ajax

Argentinos Juniors

Aston Villa

Atlético Madrid

Atlético Nacional

Barcelona

Bayern Munich

Benfica

Boca Juniors

Borussia Dortmund

Borussia Mönchengladbach

Celtic

Colo-Colo

Cruzeiro

Estudiantes

Feyenoord

Flamengo

Grêmio

Hamburger SV

Independiente

Internazionale

Juventus

Liverpool

Malmö FF

Manchester United

Milan

Nacional

Nottingham Forest

Olimpia

Once Caldas

Palmeiras

Panathinaikos

Peñarol

Porto

PSV Eindhoven

Racing

Real Madrid

Red Star Belgrade

River Plate

Santos

São Paulo

Steaua București

Vasco da Gama 

 Own goals scored for opponents

  Nasa (scored for Real Madrid in 1998)

Vélez Sarsfield

See also

References

External links
 International Clubs Cup – The Rec.Sport.Soccer Statistics Foundation

Statistics